Silver-gilt bowl is a 7th century BC silver-gilt bowl. It is in the collection of the Metropolitan Museum of Art. It dates to c. 725–675 BC.

Description and interpretation
The work depicts a winged deity (resembling Assyrian deities) cutting down a lion with a sword. Surrounding that is a number of animal and narrative motifs. This includes Egyptian subjects like a sphinx wearing a pschent and a lion walking over a dead man (symbolizing a pharaoh conquering his enemies). The outer band of the bowl also has a variety of motifs, and above that are inscriptions. One, "I am [the bowl] of Akestor, king of Paphos", was partly obliterated and replaced by "I am [the bowl] of Timokretes", presumably by the bowl's next owner.

The bowl's significance stems from its excellent condition, high quality, and its amalgam of Egyptian, Assyrian, and Phoenician features.

References

Further reading
 Communities of Style
 AKESTOR, KING OF PAPHOS

Metropolitan Museum of Art 2017 drafts
Created via preloaddraft
Metalwork of the Metropolitan Museum of Art
Ancient art in metal
Ancient Greek metalwork